"American Woman" is a 1970 rock song by The Guess Who.

American Woman may also refer to:
American Woman (2019 film), American drama film directed by Semi Chellas and starring Hong Chau and Sarah Gadon
 American Woman (2018 film), American drama film starring Sienna Miller, Aaron Paul and Christina Hendricks
 American Woman (novel), 2003 novel by Susan Choi
 American Woman (TV series), 2018 television series
 American Woman (album), 1970 album by The Guess Who, containing the song

See also
 Women in the Americas
 Women in the United States